The Indian Journal of Dermatology is a bimonthly peer-reviewed open-access medical journal published on behalf of the Indian Association of Dermatologists, Venereologists and Leprologists, West Bengal Branch. The journal covers clinical and experimental dermatology, cutaneous biology, dermatological therapeutics, cosmetic dermatology, dermatopathology, and dermatosurgery. It was established in 1955.

Abstracting and indexing 
The journal is abstracted and indexed in:

External links 
 

Open access journals
Bimonthly journals
English-language journals
Medknow Publications academic journals
Publications established in 1955
Dermatology journals
Academic journals associated with learned and professional societies of India
1955 establishments in West Bengal